A circumnavigation of the Earth is a journey from a point around the globe, returning to the point of departure. In a pedestrian circumnavigation, travelers must move around the globe and return to their starting point by their own power, either walking or running. The Guinness Book of World Records sets the requirements for a circumnavigation on foot as having traveled 18,000 miles, and crossed four continents. The World Runner's Association (WRA) is often recognized as the authority on the authenticity of pedestrian circumnavigation in the "ultrarunning" community. The WRA sets the following guidelines for circumnavigation attempts:

 The runner must begin and end their journey in the same place, and travel 26,232 kilometers on foot.
 All lines of longitude must be crossed. (They may be crossed on ship or plane if the area is unwalkable, such as an ocean.)
 The runner must pass through antipodal points, within a tolerance of ten degrees of latitude and longitude.
 The runner must set foot on at least four continents and cross them from coast to coast, and the continents must be longitudinally consecutive.

The runner is permitted to take breaks and time off, but they may not rest in any one location for more than six months, or for more than 25% of the total running time. Further, if the runner is trying to set a speed or endurance record for "running" around the world, they must be running at least 50% of the time, and walking for less than 50% of the journey.

Attempts to walk around the world began as early as 1786. Starting in 1875, dozens of circumnavigation ultrawalkers emerged, most of them frauds who fooled the public to win wagers and made a living giving lectures about their supposed “walks”. Later, a few legitimate walkers succeeded. The first legitimate ultrarunner to succeed is Konstantin Rengarten, and the most recent to succeed is Tom Turcich. The following list shows people who have, or claim to have, completed a circumnavigation on foot, sorted by date of departure.

Pedestrian circumnavigators

See also 
 List of circumnavigations

References

 
Pedestrian circumnavigators